Lieutenant-Colonel Arthur Frederick Pickard  (12 April 1844 – 1 March 1880) was a British Army officer and courtier. For his actions in New Zealand in 1863, he was awarded the Victoria Cross, the highest award for gallantry in the face of the enemy that can be awarded to British and Commonwealth forces. After further service and promotion in the Royal Artillery, Pickard was appointed an Equerry to the Duke of Connaught and Strathearn in 1871; seven years later, he was made Assistant Keeper of the Privy Purse and Assistant Private Secretary to the Queen and promoted to lieutenant-colonel, but died of tuberculosis in France, aged 35, less than two years later.

Early life 
Pickard was born on 12 April 1844 at Forest Hill in the Nottinghamshire town of Worksop. He was the third son of a former officer in the Royal Artillery, Henry William Pickard (1794–1873), JP, of Sturminster Marshall, Dorset, and 11 Carlton Crescent, Southampton, and his wife, Elizabeth, daughter of John Fullerton, of Thrybergh Park in Yorkshire. The Pickard family claimed descent from a medieval Lord Mayor of London; in the 18th century, Jocelyn Pickard, a barrister from Lincoln's Inn, moved to Bloxworth House in Dorset and married a Dorsetshire heiress; Henry William Pickard was his great-grandson in the direct male-line, although he was his father's youngest son.

Military and court career
In 1858, Pickard was promoted from being a gentleman cadet in the Royal Artillery to the rank of lieutenant. In May 1871, Pickard was appointed Equerry to Prince Arthur, later the Duke of Connaught and Strathearn; later that year, he was promoted to the rank of second captain, and in 1872 to brevet major. In December 1877, the Queen appointed Pickard a groom-in-waiting after the resignation of Lieutenant-Colonel William Henry Frederick Cavendish; the following year, he was promoted to the rank of lieutenant-colonel and in July he stepped aside as Connaught's Equerry, when he was appointed Extra Equerry and Captain Alfred Mordaunt Egerton replaced him. Later that year, the Queen appointed him Assistant Keeper of the Privy Purse, and her Assistant Private Secretary, and shortly afterwards, he was promoted to the full rank of major. In March 1879, he was appointed a Companion of the Order of the Bath.

Victoria Cross 
When Pickard was a 19-year-old lieutenant, he was serving in the Invasion of Waikato (one of the campaigns in the New Zealand Wars); he and Assistant Surgeon William Temple were awarded the Victoria Cross, the United Kingdom's highest bravery award, for the following deed, which took place on 20 November 1863 at Rangiriri, New Zealand. His citation reads:

Death 
On 1 March 1880, Pickard died at Cannes, in France, reportedly of tuberculosis. He was buried at the city's Grand Jas Cemetery. His medal group – consisting of his Victoria Cross, the insignia of the Order of the Bath, the Russian Order of St Stanislas and the Austrian Order of Leopold, and his New Zealand Medal – were purchased at auction in New Zealand on behalf of the Michael Ashcroft Trust in 2002. They are on display at the Lord Ashcroft Gallery in the Imperial War Museum in London.

References

External links

Rangiriri Pa (NZ heritage site visitor information)
Burial location of Arthur Pickard "France"
News Item "Arthur Pickard's Victoria Cross sold at auction"
 

British military personnel of the New Zealand Wars
New Zealand Wars recipients of the Victoria Cross
British recipients of the Victoria Cross
Royal Artillery officers
1844 births
1880 deaths
People from Worksop
Companions of the Order of the Bath
Equerries
19th-century deaths from tuberculosis
Recipients of the Order of Saint Stanislaus (Russian)
British Army recipients of the Victoria Cross
Tuberculosis deaths in France